The Grammy Museum Experience is an interactive, experiential museum devoted to the history and winners of the Grammy Awards which opened at the Prudential Center in Newark, New Jersey on October 20, 2017.

It is first instance of the Grammy Museum in the Northeast. Affiliated museums are the Grammy Museum at L.A. Live in Los Angeles, The Grammy Museum Mississippi, Cleveland, Mississippi and The Grammy Museum at Musicians Hall of Fame, Nashville, Tennessee.

The 8,200-square-foot Grammy Museum features multimedia presentations, public events and educational programming, and highlights some of New Jersey’s most famous music industry stars and homegrown talent, from songwriters and producers to the musicians themselves. The venue will allow guests to explore Grammy Award history, experience being onstage and interact with various aspects of the recording process, including playing instruments or singing (interactively) with some of the music industry’s stars and legendary musicians.

See also
 List of music museums
New Jersey Hall of Fame

References

External links
The Grammy Museum Experience

Grammy Awards
Museums in Newark, New Jersey
Museums established in 2017
2017 establishments in New Jersey
Music of New Jersey
Culture of Newark, New Jersey